Barbara Lynne Clark (born September 24, 1958), later known by her married name Barbara Parolin, is a former competitive swimmer from Canada, who competed primarily in international freestyle events.  At the 1976 Summer Olympics in Montreal, Quebec, Clark won a bronze medal in the women's 4x100-metre freestyle relay, alongside Canadian teammates Becky Smith, Gail Amundrud and Anne Jardin.

See also
 List of Olympic medalists in swimming (women)

References

 Canadian Olympic Committee

1958 births
Living people
Olympic swimmers of Canada
Sportspeople from Alberta
Swimmers at the 1976 Summer Olympics
Olympic bronze medalists for Canada
People from the County of Paintearth No. 18
Olympic bronze medalists in swimming
Canadian female freestyle swimmers
Medalists at the 1976 Summer Olympics